Karib is an Arabic surname. Notable people with the surname include:

 Abu Karib, 4th century ruler of Yemen
 Jenius Karib (born 1993), Malaysian football defender
 Khaled Karib (born 2000), Qatari football player

Arabic-language surnames